Vadul lui Isac is a village in Cahul District, Moldova.

The village is located at the western end of the southern Lower Trajan's Wall.

References

External links
 Photo of the Wall @ Google Maps

Villages of Cahul District
Populated places on the Prut